Orton is a mostly residential area of the city of Peterborough, in the Peterborough district, in the ceremonial county of Cambridgeshire, England. For electoral purposes it comprises Orton Longueville, Orton Waterville and Orton with Hampton wards in North West Cambridgeshire

History
Orton was designated the second township in the new town expansion of Peterborough in 1967. It is composed of the ancient villages of Orton Waterville and Orton Longueville, together with the newer developments of Orton Brimbles, Orton Goldhay, Orton Malborne, Orton Southgate, Orton Wistow and most recently Orton Northgate. All lie south of the River Nene and are thus historically in Huntingdonshire, but are not in the current local government district of that name.

In common with many New Towns the Ortons are characterised by extensive landscaping and tree planting. The A605 runs through the Ortons, connecting Peterborough to the A1(M) which runs from London to Edinburgh. There is no church in Orton Wistow or Orton Northgate: these both fall within the parish of St Andrew's, Alwalton.

As the Ortons were established, health centres were constructed, initially in Herlington and then at the Orton Centre. For a short time there was also a small branch surgery in Orton Wistow. Due to the expansion of the area and decay of the premises at Herlington, the Orton Wistow surgery was replaced by a new surgery at Clayton, Orton Goldhay.

In 2001 Anglia Regional Co-operative Society closed its Rainbow supermarket at Orton Centre, the only major supermarket serving the Ortons. This was widely assumed to be due to competition from the Tesco Extra which had opened at nearby Serpentine Green in Hampton and the ongoing degeneration of the centre. In October 2008 the Co-operative returned to the Ortons with a new store in the regenerated Orton Centre, now renamed Ortongate.

Orton Brimbles
This is an area of mixed public and private sector housing dating almost entirely from the 1980s. Orton Brimbles contains the Ortons' first and only purpose-built solar powered houses at Gostwick. There is also Ormiston Meadows Academy, formerly Matley Primary School, a mainstream primary school with Enhanced Resources provision for children with physical disabilities.

There is a row of shops, including a post office, at Matley which also has a community centre where the Salvation Army hold Sunday services. Orton Brimbles falls within Orton Waterville Parish Council area.

Orton Goldhay
Orton Goldhay was laid out from the mid-1970s by Peterborough Development Corporation as part of the city's second township. The area is largely residential but contains the district shopping centre known as Orton Centre, and one of the Ortons' two secondary schools, Ormiston Bushfield Academy. Much of the housing here was built for the public sector and originally housed overspill population from London.

Orton Longueville

Until the 1960s, Orton Longueville was a village separated from Peterborough by open farmland. Orton Longueville is home to Nene Park Academy, formerly Orton Longueville School. The 'village' contains many pre-20th-century buildings including Orton Hall, once used as a prisoner of war camp during the Second World War (now a hotel), several thatched cottages, a cricket field and the 13th-century church of Holy Trinity. The church contains many historic monuments to the families who once owned properties in the village, including the Huntlys and Copes, and has a rare wall painting of St Christopher. There is still a village green and close by is a half-mile long plantation of giant redwood wellingtonia trees known as the 'Long Walk'.

Orton Longueville saw many homes built after the Second World War. It is cut through north-south by the Nene Parkway (A1260) constructed in the 1970s. To the west of this road lies the original 'village', and to the east is a housing estate and some light warehousing laid out on former farmland in the latter half of the 20th century. To the north east is a newer housing area known as Botolph Green. There was a separate parish called Botolphbridge until it was combined with Longueville in 1702.

Orton Malborne
Similar in character to Orton Goldhay, this area was also created from the mid-1970s and lies along the dedicated bus route leading to the city centre. There are local shops at Herlington and Eldern, both of which had pubs, The Dragonfly and The Eldern (formerly The Shire Horse). Only the former remains open, the latter having been sold and converted to homes.

There is a purpose-built community centre at Herlington. A second community centre that looks like a 3-storey end of terrace house with attached hall at 156 Leighton was closed by the City Council and sold for private housing in 2009.

In the period since October 1976, five church congregations have met in the area. Christian Presence was first, established as an Anglican and later Methodist plant in a community house and later at Leighton Community Centre before moving to Herlington Community Centre in 2009. The latter has also been home to the Life Tabernacle Apostolic Church, and the building was also used by another Christian Fellowship in the 1980s. Nearby is the purpose-built St.Luke's Roman Catholic church. The Orton Gospel Hall is at the east end of Malborne Way.

There is a primary school at Leighton and one at nearby Winyates also serves the Malborne area. Herlington has a pre-school. The Lime Academy educational trust has a campus hub for children on Malborne Way built on the site of The Tunnel Adventure Playground.

Orton Northgate
The latest addition to 'the Ortons' and the fastest growing, Orton Northgate previously formed part of the East of England Showground site.

Orton Northgate's local Anglican church is  St Andrew's, Alwalton.

Orton Southgate
This is mainly a business area containing offices and factories, including Nokia, NCR, Amazon, XL Displays, Yodal and others. It also contains a housing area centred on Dunblane Drive, which was partly built by Persimmon Homes around 1995, and added to by a small group of David Wilson Homes in around 1997.

The East of England Showground sold off some of its land to developers to expand the housing towards Alwalton, linking Dunblane Drive with Loch Lomond Way. However, there was a moratorium on building in October 2008, and as of February 2010 the site remained dormant.

Orton Waterville

One of the original 'Ortons', Orton Waterville also retains a village atmosphere and contains many thatched and stone built cottages and the 13th-century parish church of St Mary's. It once had its own Orton Waterville railway station, but both the station and the line it stood on have now closed.

Orton Wistow
Orton Wistow was laid out during the 1980s by private developers, with the last developments being completed around 1992. This development lies adjacent to the Country Park known as Ferry Meadows and the Nene Valley Railway. There is a primary school called Orton Wistow Primary School.

Transport
Two bus services serve the Ortons. The Citi 1 runs every 10 minutes from Orton to the city centre and continues to Werrington. Route 60 links Orton Malborne with Serpentine Green, Stanground and the City Centre infrequently. Stagecoach Corby also operate Service 23 between Orton Waterville and Peterborough Queensgate bus station and Service 24 between Thrapston/Oundle and Peterborough Queensgate bus station.

References

Suburbs of Peterborough